Olli Eino Laiho (18 February 1943, in Savonlinna – 31 May 2010, in Helsinki) was a Finnish gymnast who competed in the 1964 Summer Olympics and in the 1968 Summer Olympics.

References

1943 births
2010 deaths
Finnish male artistic gymnasts
Olympic gymnasts of Finland
Gymnasts at the 1964 Summer Olympics
Gymnasts at the 1968 Summer Olympics
Olympic silver medalists for Finland
Olympic medalists in gymnastics
Medalists at the 1968 Summer Olympics
People from Savonlinna
Sportspeople from South Savo
20th-century Finnish people